Fallout is a young adult novel by author Ellen Hopkins. It follows Glass in the Crank series.

Summary

Hunter, Autumn, and Summer—three of Kristina Snow's five children—live in different homes, with different guardians and different last names. They share only a predisposition for addiction and a host of troubled feelings toward the mother who barely knows them, a mother who has been riding with the monster, crank, for twenty years.
Hunter is nineteen, angry, getting by in college with a job at a radio station, a girlfriend he loves in the only way he knows how, and the occasional party. Autumn doesn't know about Hunter, Summer, or their two youngest brothers, Donald and David. She lives with her single aunt and alcoholic grandfather. When her aunt gets married, and the only family she's ever known crumbles, Autumn's compulsive habits lead her to drink. Summer is the youngest of the three. And to her, family is only abuse at the hands of her father's girlfriends and a slew of foster parents. As each searches for real love and true family, they find themselves pulled toward the one person who links them together—Kristina, Bree, mother, addict. But it is in each other, and in themselves, that they find the trust, the courage, the hope to break the cycle.

Characters

Kristina Georgia Snow is the meth addicted mother of Hunter, Autumn and Summer. Her story is told in the previous books by Ellen Hopkins, Crank and Glass. Although Autumn does not know her mother is Kristina, she is often mentioned in Hunter and Summer's stories; determining their lives without particularly being involved. This druggie mom has already set them on different paths, and because of her addiction, each of her children seem to have a characteristic that she possessed when she was dancing with the "monster."
Hunter Seth Haskins, Kristina's oldest son, was adopted and raised by Kristina's mother, Marie Haskins, and has the best life out of all of Kristina's children. He uses drugs too, but doesn't dare try meth because he knows how it can affect his life in such a negative way. Hunter, the radio celebrity, is often caught in sticky situations because of his small-town fame. Throughout the book he is constantly trying not to give into the temptation of cheating on or disappointing his girlfriend. Even though Hunter knows who his mother is, the resemblance between them is slim, and he is desperate to find the person whose chromosomes gave him the looks his mother lacked. In a relationship with his described gorgeous girlfriend, although he cheated on her with Leah he is still known to be in love with her.
Autumn Rose Sheperd, is Kristina's daughter with Trey. Kristina became pregnant with Autumn at the end of Glass. Autumn, now a high schooler, lives with Trey's father and his sister Cora and does not know her mother or half-siblings. She is anxious and suffers from symptoms of Obsessive Compulsive Disorder. She begins her first romantic relationship with a classmate named Bryce but fears he will lose interest if she does not find a way to keep him.
Summer Lily Kenwood, the youngest child of Kristina's during this chapter of her life, is the only child who knows her mother and father. Even so, this foster child has been tossed from home to home and has experienced some of the most terrifying things she possibly could. She is also the one child who keeps in contact with Kristina, and knows more about her background than the others. Although Kristina hasn't been a part of her life, it's almost as if she is an exact replica of Kristina through her choices and actions.
Trey, the other meth addict parent of Autumn, was the one Kristina was truly "in love" with and who played a major role in making Kristina's addiction to the monster stronger. He is a jail bird, and flies in and out of prisons causing Autumn's grandfather to be stressed and not trust Autumn when she goes out, in fear that she may be making the same mistakes Trey made. He was never a big part of Autumn's life and she has not seen him since she was very little, and even that was a memory she is not fond of.
Grandfather, Trey's father, takes care of Autumn. He keeps her on a tight leash trying not to make the same mistakes he did with Trey. All the while, it seems like he might have influenced Trey's druggie behavior, being a pill popper himself.
Marie Haskins, the adoptive mother of Hunter, is Kristina's own mother. She is a writer and the books she wrote gained Hunter slight popularity in high school after years of being bullied. When Kristina got pregnant and resumed meth use, she was the one who tried to help her, but ended up kicking her out.
Dad (Summer's), Summer's drug using biological father, took care of her for most of her life before she was dumped into the foster system. The girlfriend he had when Summer came to live with him is the reason for the permanent scarring of Summer's psyche, because she molested her. His name is given as Jason Kenwood on the "Fallout Family Tree" of Hopkins's website.
Aunt Cora, Trey's sister, is Autumn's best friend and Aunt. She is the only one for Autumn to confide in and talk to because Autumn doesn't have many friends at school. She eventually marries Liam and leaves Autumn behind to make friends her own age.
Nikki, Hunter's flawless girlfriend, constantly puts up with Hunter's cheating and drug use. She loves Hunter just as much as he loves her, and tries her hardest to keep him in line.
Kyle, the Summer loving friend of Matt, uses meth and other anonymous drugs to feel better about his also shattered life. His meth usage and smooth charismatic ways cause Summer's dad to even say that Kyle reminds him of Trey.
Scott Haskins, Kristina's stepfather, is Hunter's adoptive father. He relates to Hunter and Nikki with his wife, and the struggles he has been married to a famous Martha Stewart-like writer.
Brendan, the biological father of Hunter, is introduced through Montana—as her date to a radio function. Although Hunter had never met his father, when Hunter saw him for the first time he was able to look in his eyes and see how similar Brendan's eyes were to his own, and knew exactly who he was.
Matt, Summer's ex-boyfriend, is Kyle's best friend.
Bryce, Autumn's first boyfriend, was her key to not being a loner. But she immediately gets attached to him, and has sex with him—Without protection. And she gets pregnant.
Montana, the plastic co worker, is Hunter's work partner for radio show outings.
Micah, the cousin of Liam, flirts with Autumn constantly until a drunken incident goes too far, and his aggressive nature is revealed.
Liam, Aunt Cora's husband, changes Autumn's life, by taking her Aunt Cora away from her.
Leah, the groupie, tore Nikki and Hunter apart when she convinced Hunter to cheat on Nikki with her.
Ron, Kristina's current abusive, drug addict boyfriend. Father of Donald and David.

Reception
Fallout, like Hopkins's other novels, has received both positive reviews and challenges.

Multiple reviewers highlighted the book's style, which Publishers Weekly called "gritty" and "gripping." School Library Journal (SLJ) also complimented the novel's "not-quite poetry" writing style, noting that it was "as solid as ever, though her visual formations get more mystifying and extraneous with each novel." Voice of Youth Advocates (VOYA) praised Hopkins, saying that even though the novel contained the word "fuck" and some sexual description, the "poetry is the perfect vehicle to deliver the festering emotional beating that drug addiction inflicts on families."  Kirkus Reviews similarly noted, "The clipped free verse sharply conveys fragmented and dissociated emotions."

Even with all the buzz about Fallout being positive, SLJ noted that "the Venn diagram of Kristina's baby daddies, parents, grandparents, aunts, uncles, and drug buddies is impossible to follow," which may frustrate readers. Regardless of its difficulty, VOYA wrote that it was a quick read—despite its intimidating page length—and impossible to put down.

In 2022, Fallout, along with four of Hopkins's other novels, was listed among 52 books banned by the Alpine School District following the implementation of Utah law H.B. 374, “Sensitive Materials In Schools." Many of the books were removed because they were considered to contain pornographic material according to the new law, which defines porn using the following criteria:

 "The average person" would find that the material, on the whole, "appeals to prurient interest in sex"
 The material "is patently offensive in the description or depiction of nudity, sexual conduct, sexual excitement, sadomasochistic abuse, or excretion"
 The material, on the whole, "does not have serious literary, artistic, political or scientific value."

References

Bibliography
Hopkins, Ellen. Fallout. New York, New York: Simon & Schuster Children's Publishing Division, 2010.

2010 American novels
American young adult novels
Novels by Ellen Hopkins
Verse novels
Censored books
Margaret K. McElderry books